IÉSEG School of Management (Institut d'Économie Scientifique Et de Gestion, translated to "The Institute of Scientific Economics and Management") is a French grande école, private and graduate business school, established in 1964 in Lille, France.
IÉSEG School of Management is a member of the private Université Catholique de Lille consortium, the largest private university in France in terms of student population and endowment. The school has two campuses, one in Lille and one in Paris. IÉSEG holds the "Triple Crown" of international business school accreditations: EQUIS, AACSB, and AMBA. 

IÉSEG School of Management is consistently ranked  as one of France's Top 10 business schools according to the International Financial Times. As a French Grande Ecole and member of the Conférence des Grandes Écoles, IÉSEG is one of the most recognised and academically rigorous higher education institutions in France.

As of the 2019/2020 academic year, the school has more than 9,000 alumni, 7000 students on the Lille and Paris campuses, 2,600 of which are international students representing more than 100 nationalities.

The School has more than 700 professors; 82% of its permanent faculty is international, 100% hold a PhD and it has a network of more than 300 partner universities in 75 countries and over 2500 company partners.

History

Institut d'Économie Scientifique et de Gestion (IÉSEG Lille) was founded in 1964 in Lille by the economist and former dean of the Université Catholique de Lille, Michel Falise. In 1976, the private school was recognized by the Ministry of National Education (France) and became member of the Conférence des Grandes écoles in 1997. In 2002, IESEG was one of the first business schools in France which started to propose a Master in management fully taught in english.

From 2006, IESEG started to collaborate with the CNRS in a shared laboratory and is since then, one of the business schools in France with HEC Paris and others to have this agreement. 
In 2012, the school received the EQUIS accreditation, in 2013 the AACSB and in 2013 AMBA. 

In recent years, IESEG chose to not develop overseas campuses but instead, to develop the Lille and Paris campuses. In contrary to most colleges and universities in France, the Lille campus is accessible 24 hours a day, 7 days a week.

Grande École System 

IÉSEG School of Management is a Grande école, a French institution of higher education that is separate from, but parallel and connected to the main framework of the French public university system. Similar to the Ivy League in the United States, Oxbridge in the UK, and C9 League in China, Grandes Écoles are elite academic institutions that admit students through an extremely competitive process. Alums go on to occupy elite positions within government, administration, and corporate firms in France.

Although they are more expensive than public universities in France, Grandes Écoles typically have much smaller class sizes and student bodies, and many of their programs are taught in English. International internships, study abroad opportunities, and close ties with government and the corporate world are a hallmark of the Grandes Écoles. Many of the top ranked business schools in Europe are members of the Conférence des Grandes Écoles (CGE), as is IÉSEG, and out of the 250 business schools in France, only 39 are CGE members.

Degrees from IÉSEG are accredited by the Conférence des Grandes Écoles and awarded by the Ministry of National Education (France). IÉSEG is further accredited by the elite international business school accrediting organizations and it holds the much coveted Triple accreditation: The European Foundation for Management Development (EQUIS), The Association to Advance Collegiate Schools of Business (AACSB), and Association of MBAs (AMBA) In 2022, the Financial Times ranked its Masters in Management program 26th in the world.

Programs

Higher education business degrees in France are organized into three levels thus facilitating international mobility: the Licence/Bachelor's, Master's, and Doctorate degrees. A Bachelor's degree requires the completion of 180 ECTS credits (bac+3); a Master's, requires an additional 120 ECTS credits (bac+5). The highly coveted PGE (Program Grand École) ends with the awarding of Master's in Management (M.M.) degree. Outside of the PGE, students at IÉSEG can be awarded other Master's degrees, such as the MBA (bac + 5)

Grande Ecole Program
Unlike many other French Grande écoles of business which have a three-year program (after two years of Classes Préparatoires) IÉSEG offers a five-year Master in Management program just after completing the French Baccalauréat : the Grande École programme. In addition to mainstream courses, students are allowed to specialize in a variety of subjects that range from finance to human resources.

This program is composed of a three-year Bachelor cycle followed by a two-year Master of Science in Management.

Bachelor cycle: During the three-year bachelor cycle, students study different areas of management such as International Business and Marketing and Operations Management. Master cycle the 2-year Master in Management cycle gives students the opportunity to specialize in a particular field: Audit – Control, Economics and International Trade Strategy, Entrepreneurship and Innovation, Finance, Human Resources Management, Information Systems Management, Operations Management, Marketing, or International Negotiation & Sales Management.

It is possible for newly admitted students to follow all the courses of the five-year program only in English, allowing foreign students with no French background to be admitted as an IÉSEG student.

Bachelor in International Business (BIB) 
Launched in 2015 at the Lille Campus, the Bachelor in International Business, Diplôme d’Études Supérieures en Affaires Internationales, is designed for students interested in management and international business taught entirely in English. Moreover, the programme has been designed and built to allow  students to join the labor market after three years of studies. Majority of the students selected into the BIB programme are international students and French students with prior expatriate experience which creates a culturally diverse group and a small class size.

Students are taught to manage projects for international companies and to operate in complex business environments in an ethically responsible and sustainable way.

The Bachelor in International Business program consists of 6 semesters of coursework, including an option for an exchange or double-degree at one of IESEG's university partners. Three internships totaling seven months of progressive work experience means that the students graduate with professional connections and experience.

In their third year students  have the opportunity to choose specialised electives in areas such as marketing, financial reporting and analysis, international negotiation, capital markets, and international project management. As a prerequisite for graduation, students are also required to spend at least three months abroad (academic exchange or professional experience).

The BIB (“Diplôme d’Études Supérieures en Affaires Internationales”) is accredited by the French Higher Education Ministry (VISA BAC+3). Starting September 2020 the programme will also be taught at IÉSEG's Paris-La Défense campus.

Master of Science - MSc 
IÉSEG's Master's of Science programs are taught entirely in English.

Upon successful completion of their Postgraduate Program (90 ECTS), admitted students are awarded the traditional ‘MSc degree’ from the Conférence des Grandes Écoles (“Diplôme de la Conférence des Grandes Écoles”), which attests to the School's excellence.

Since September 2019, IÉSEG School of Management is authorized by the French Ministry of Higher Education, Research and Innovation to also deliver the ‘Grade de Master’ (a State-recognized degree) for its Postgraduate Programs* (“Diplôme d’Études Spécialisées en Management International”) – and to provide a registered title with the French RNCP (the National Repertory of Professional Certification).

International MBA 
The International MBA – IMBA is a one-year program completely taught in English.

IÉSEG international MBA is accredited by AMBA.

This programme IMBA provides a registered title with the French RNCP (National Repertory of Professional Certification) Level 1, recognised in France and in Europe.

In its first participation in the 2020 Global MBA Ranking, IÉSEG was ranked 38th globally, consolidated as the third school with the highest percentage of foreign professors (80%) and shares, together with two schools, the first place for the high percentage of international students.

The class includes students from 22 different nationalities, composed of 49% of women and 51% of men, and on average have 7 years of work experience prior to joining the programme.

Executive MBA (EMBA) 
Executive MBA is targeted at people having responsibilities in an organisation and who have a career development project towards a new role involving leadership and human competences.

This programme provides a registered title with the French RNCP (National Repertory of Professional Certification) Level 1, recognised in France and in Europe.

The participants of the Executive MBA have diverse profiles allowing them to bring a great wealth of exchanges and projects. This diversity is reflected, in particular, by the different jobs from which they arise and the variety of the jobs that they perform. The class includes students from 19 different nationalities, composed of 36% of women and 64% of men, and on average have 16 years of work experience prior to joining the programme.

Admission 
The admission in the 1st year of the "Grande Ecole Programme" is carried out through the Access exam. The admission is highly selective as in 2019, only 800 students were admitted amidst more than 5700 candidates. 

Admission for Bachelor in International Business and Specialised Master's programmes is done by professional file package (online application, CV, English language proficiency certificates, optional supporting documents) and online motivation video or interview to be reviewed by admission jury.

IÉSEG offers large numbers of scholarships in the form of tuition waiver for Bachelor International Business and Specialised master's degree seeking students. There is no separate application for scholarships and decisions are made by the Admissions Jury at the same time as applications are being reviewed.

International

Exchange program
IÉSEG has more than 300 partner universities around the world (in 75 different countries) including:
- Harvard University
- Cornell University
- University of California Berkeley
- University of Glasgow
- University of Sheffield
- IE Business School
- Korea University
- University of Bologna
- Bocconi University
- Peking University
- University of Hong Kong
- McGill University
- Copenhagen Business School
- Ludwig-Maximilians-Universität
- Lomonosov Moscow State University

IESEG's students can spend one or two semesters as an exchange student during their Bachelor's degree, and one or two additional semesters during the Master's degree. In addition, the School welcomes more than 2500 international students each year.

Dual degree
IESEG proposes several dual degrees both for the Bachelor and Master program.

Research
IÉSEG shares a research department with CNRS, a state-owned research body. Primary areas of research include economics, quantitative methods, finance, accounting, management, marketing, and negotiation.

Centers of research expertise

•	IÉSEG Center of excellence in Negotiation (ICoN): ICoN is active in negotiation research, teaching and knowledge transfer. ICoN adopts a transversal approach to negotiation and relationship establishment, spanning over management, employment relations, marketing (sales and procurement), international relations and law.

•	IÉSEG Center for marketing Analytics (ICMA): The IÉSEG Center for marketing Analytics (ICMA) is a research group that aims to establish durable research collaborations between academics active in research in the field of marketing analytics, including database marketing, customer intelligence, digital analytics or analytical CRM, and businesses in need of solutions related to one of these topics.

•	IÉSEG Center for Organizational Responsibility (ICOR): ICOR is IÉSEG's Center for Organizational Responsibility. Founded in 2014, it aims to create and disseminate conceptual knowledge and practice-oriented tools in the field of social responsibility, sustainability and business and society relationships for students, researchers, professionals and their organizations.

It is composed of and coordinated by members of IÉSEG academic staff from all departments.

Locations

Lille campus (headquarter)
The historical campus, located in the heart of the city of Lille, is composed of modern buildings for a total surface of more than 20 000 m2 (6 buildings).

IÉSEG's facilities (classrooms, multimedia centres, cafeterias and offices) are accessible to students 24 hours a day, 7 days a week. All students have an ID card with a magnetic strip that allows for individual access.

More than 200 computer workstations connected to the Internet are available to students and faculty.

The Vauban University Library (Bibliothèque Universitaire Vauban) has over 55,000 books and more than 600 journal subscriptions.

A renovation and extension project for the historic Lille Campus called "The IÉSEG Village" aims to create 4,100 m2 of additional space and renovate 4,600 m2 of pre-existing space with green terraces, spaces and rainwater harvesting. The project is set to be completed by September 2021.

Paris campus
In 2008, IÉSEG opened a second campus in the  Grande Arche de La Défense at the heart of the business district of La Défense.

The Paris Campus consists of 3 buildings of a total of 15,500 m2 (166,840 sq ft), and provides students with lecture halls, classrooms, multimedia rooms, 2 trading rooms, a library, 2 cafeterias and meeting rooms for clubs and associations.

Notable alumni 

 Alma, French singer and songwriter
 Gabriel Ramon Castello Taliani - Chairman & Director at UBS
 Eric Faintreny (1985) - Former chairman and ex-CEO of Redcats
 Christophe CATOIR (1995) - President France and Northern Europe, Adecco Group
 Bruno DE FOUGEROUX (1998) - Former chief executive Danone Water France & Benelux
 Guillaume FOURDINIER (2010) - Co-founder & CEO, Agricool
 Elsa HERMAL (2012) - Co-founder & General Manager, Epicery
 Corinne HOCHART (1994) - CEO, Oney France
 Etienne HUREZ (1994) - CEO, Boulanger Group
 Pierre-Alain VIELVOYE (1992) - Chairman, Groupe Adeo
 Nicolas WALLAERT (1995), General Manager, Cofidis France

References

IESEG
Business schools in France
Educational institutions established in 1964
1964 establishments in France